Yli-Kitka is a lake in Finland, in the municipalities of Kuusamo and Posio. The lake is connected to Ala-Kitka at Kilkilösalmi strait. Yli-Kitka combined with Ala-Kitka is the largest unregulated lake in Finland. Together they are called Kitkajärvi or simply Kitka. Riisitunturi National Park is located north of the lake. From Ala-Kitka the waters flow through the Kitkanjoki river to the Oulankajoki river which is part of the Kovda River basin that drains into the White Sea in Russia.

References

LYli-Kitka
Landforms of North Ostrobothnia
Lakes of Kuusamo
Lakes of Posio